Phases (formerly known as JJAMZ and pronounced juh-jamz)  is an American indie pop band from Los Angeles, California composed of Jason Boesel (Rilo Kiley / Bright Eyes/Conor Oberst and the Mystic Valley Band), Alex Greenwald (Phantom Planet / Blackblack), Michael Runion, and Z Berg (The Like).

Background
JJAMZ was started at karaoke night at Guys in Hollywood. The band name is an acronym using the first letter of each member's name. The group was a means of escape from each member's respective bands at a time when things seemed hectic for each member. "JJAMZ started at an interesting time in all of our lives. We all needed some kind of escape from relationships or our other bands. It was a tumultuous time, and the lyrics just came out. It was like word vomit. I can't remember," said Z Berg, lead vocalist for the Like, in one of their first interviews as a band.

The band played their first concert at the Echo Plex on January 27, 2009, and went on to release their debut album, Suicide Pact, on July 10, 2012. The album's songs were featured in the television shows: "Get What You Want" in Awkward, "Heartbeat" in Pretty Little Liars and "Cleverly Disgusted" in 90210. To support this release, the band opened for The Hush Sound during a brief tour in October 2012.

Following James Valentine's departure from the band, the name of the band was changed to Phases. In early 2015, the band signed with Warner Bros. Records and on May 12, 2015, released their first new music under their new name. "I'm in Love with My Life", "Betty Blue", and "Cooler" were all released on the same day, with a music video directed by Ethan Tobman for "I'm in Love with My Life" released simultaneously. "I'm in Love with My Life" was featured in The Sims 4: Perfect Patio Stuffs official launch trailer as well as the television shows Orange Is the New Black and Faking It.

The band reunited for a performance under the JJAMZ lineup for the Z Berg & Friends Christmas Prom on December 4, 2021.

DiscographyStudio albums Suicide Pact  (2012) 
 For Life (2015)EPs'''
 Afterparty'' (2016)

Singles
 "I'm In Love with My Life" (2015) [#35 Alternative Songs, #4 Dance Club Songs]

References

External links

Indie pop groups from Los Angeles
Musical groups established in 2009
American supergroups
Musical groups from Los Angeles
Synthpop groups
Dangerbird Records artists